Nangaimozhi is a village in the district of Tuticorin, Tamil Nadu, India. It is located 55 km from Tirunelveli, 52 km from Tuticorin and 17 km from Thiruchendur. The nearest airport is Thiruvananthapuram airport. Temples in Nangaimozhi include Ganapathi, Manthira Murthy, Parameswari Amman and Shiva.

This village population may be 100 to 200. Several community people like Thevar, Pillai, Nadar are living in this village. At one time, this village was surrounded by palm trees. Karupatti (palm jaggery) making was their livelihood. Latter villagers were doing agriculture with well water. Nowadays in this small village no well water is potable. It is contaminated with several minerals. Only two well water is portable one is near Manthiramoorthy samy koil another one is near bus stand.

Recently one of very old Shiva temple was renovated by Tamil Nadu Government. Siva Temple is Kalatheeswarar Koil. Sri Gnanaprasunnambikai Sametha Sri Kalatheeswarar. Raghu & Kethu Parihara
Sthalam like Sri Kalahasthi in Andhra Pradesh.

Thirukoil is maintained by Hindu Religious & endowment Board, Tamil Nadu GOVT.
Old debris had been removed away. Completely, a new construction of this Temple is being started from foundation - May 2013. Thirukoil is constructed by means of Govt funds.

This temple was construct by  Telugu Chozha dynasty 

The same temple located in Andhra , Sri kaalahasthi

Upayathararhal / Donars are invited for the Holy Work for Better Renovation.
For further more details in this regard , Pradosha Committee, Sri
Kalatheeswarar Koil, Nangaimozhy 628210.

Villages in Thoothukudi district